Christian Dornier (born July 15, 1958) is a French mass murderer who murdered his sister and mother and wounded his father with a 12-gauge double-barrelled shotgun at their farm on July 12, 1989. He then drove through the village of Luxiol and the adjacent area, shooting people at random. A total of fourteen people were killed and eight others injured in Dornier's half-hour rampage, before police managed to subdue him.

Dornier was diagnosed with schizophrenia and thus could not be held accountable for his crime according to French law, much to the anger of the victims' families. He has been treated in a psychiatric hospital in Sarreguemines since April 1991.

Life
Christian Dornier was born in Baume-les-Dames, the oldest child of Georges and Jeanne Dornier; he had a sister named Corinne and a brother named Serge. Dornier served twelve months in the military around 1981, which apparently negatively affected him. Dornier was described as a reserved person who liked to read and work in the forest. According to his brother he had no friends and hardly talked to anyone, sometimes not talking to anyone in the nearby village of Luxiol for weeks.

One and a half years prior to the shooting, Dornier's father decided to retire and hand over the farm to him in three years. Dornier enrolled in a month-long agricultural course to prepare for taking over the farm, but he returned after a week, apparently broken. He shaved his head, began to smoke, abandoned his farm work, and became violent. Eventually Dornier's father decided not to cede the farm to him. Three months prior to the shooting, Dornier, together with his father, bought a Volkswagen Golf GTI because he wanted the choice to leave the farm whenever he wished.

In the months prior to the rampage, Dornier fired shots at his father and his neighbour René Barrand, and pelted a woman with stones. The incidents were discussed at the village council, but it was decided that no action was needed since Dornier never had any trouble with the law. However, Dornier's family was advised to get him psychiatric help, while his father began to hide his guns. Dornier was regularly visited by a psychiatrist from Baume-les-Dames, who prescribed him tranquilizers, but according to his brother he never took them. Dornier's parents considered putting him in a psychiatric hospital, but he became furious when his doctor talked to him about the matter and his mother eventually decided against it.

In July 1989, Dornier apparently had a nervous breakdown and didn't attend the wedding of his sister on July 8. Instead, he drove through the area the entire day.

Shooting
On July 12, 1989, Dornier refused to have lunch with his family. He moved the car of his brother-in-law, Daniel Maillard, out of the way of his own vehicle, and then waited in the kitchen, where he had hidden a double-barrelled shotgun behind a cupboard. The shotgun was earlier found by Maillard when it was overthrown by his dog, though he thought that Dornier's father had put it there after the previous shooting incidents.

At 14:30, when the car of cattle inseminator Marcel Lechine pulled up outside the house, Dornier, apparently thinking that his brother Serge had just arrived, grabbed the gun and killed Lechine upon entry. He then opened fire at his family, killing his sister by shooting her at point-blank range, and wounding his 63-year-old father with a shot to the neck. Dornier pursued his father to a neighbour's house and shot him again in his side. He then returned home and fatally wounded his mother while she was calling police. She later died in hospital. Maillard escaped the shooting unharmed because he was in the bathroom at that time and fled through a window.

Dornier packed more ammunition and left the farm in his car, driving around the area and shooting people at random. He first encountered 10-year-old Yoan Robez-Masson and his adopted brother Johnny and killed them both as they were riding their bikes. From a distance of 300 metres he then killed Stanislas and Marie Périard; Louis Cuenot; and Louis Liard; and wounded six others, among them Juliette Périard; Jeanine Cuenot; a 14-year-old girl named Angeline; and René Barrand, who was shot in the head and legs. Dornier also shot at the latter's wife, Marie-Therese, who was standing in her kitchen. After he had killed the niece of Mayor Roger Clausse, five-year-old Pauline Faivre-Pierret, and was about to reload his gun to shoot her aunt when Joel Clausse, the mayor's son, grabbed a gun and fired a shot at him. Dornier, hit in the neck, then fled to continue his rampage elsewhere.

While Roger Clausse alerted police, Dornier drove towards Baume-les-Dames, killing Louis Girardot on the way and shooting gendarme René Sarrazin in the arm. While being chased by 40 police officers, he shot Georges Pernin and Marie-Alice Champroy at a crossroads  causing their cars to crash  and killed Pierre Boeuf. When he came to Verne, he was finally engaged by police and wounded in the stomach during a shootout before being taken into custody.

The reason for the shooting is not known, though it was speculated that Dornier was angry because his father had decided not to turn over the farm's management to him. Police recovered two suitcases at Dornier's farm, packed, among other things, with books and clothes, suggesting that he had planned to flee afterwards.

Victims
Pierre Boeuf
Marie-Alice Champroy
Louis Cuenot, 67
Jeanne Dornier, 57, Christian Dornier's mother
Corinne Dornier, 26, Christian Dornier's sister
Pauline Faivre-Pierret, 5
Louis Girardot, 47
Marcel Lechine, 45
Louis Liard, 50
Marie Périard, 81
Stanislas Périard, 79, brother of Marie Périllard
Georges Pernin, 40, teacher from Autechaux
Yoan Robez-Masson, 10
Johnny Robez-Masson, 14, brother of Yoan Robez-Masson

Aftermath
Prime Minister Michel Rocard sent his condolences. All festivities planned for celebrating the Bastille Day on July 14 were cancelled in Baume-les-Dames and replaced with a solemn ceremony to commemorate the victims of the shooting.

Dornier was kept under heavy guard in a hospital in Besançon. On July 15 he was transferred to the prison hospital in Fresnes and charged with fourteen counts of murder and eight counts of attempted murder. Two psychiatrists were appointed to examine his mental state, and in November the same year they declared that Dornier had schizophrenia, was therefore not responsible for his crimes, and should be confined in a special facility for dangerous patients. Their findings were confirmed in February 1990 and so he was declared insane and transferred from the prison in Dijon, where he was held in remand, to the mental hospital in Sarreguemines on April 18, 1991.

An application by the victims' families to bring Dornier before a criminal court was dismissed on March 2, 1994. On March 16 the same year, about fifty residents of Luxiol protested against the decision in front of the court in Besançon.

See also
Eric Borel, who murdered his family and 13 others in Toulon on September 23, 1995
Guy Martel, who killed seven people in Ille-et-Vilaine and Cotes-du-Nord on June 19, 1985
Nanterre massacre, in which Richard Durn killed eight city councillors on March 27, 2002
Marseille bar massacre of 1978, when ten people were killed by gunmen

References

External links
World Notes, Time (July 24, 1989)
El múltiple homicida de Francia disparó hace un mes contra un vecino, El País (July 14, 1989)
Le village sans coupable, l'Humanité (July 13, 1990)
French farmer kills mother, sister, 12 others, The Boston Globe (July 13, 1989)
French village mourns victims of shooting rampage, The Austin American-Statesman (July 15, 1989)
Dans le Doubs, un forcené tue quatorze personnes Terreur au village, Le Monde (July 14, 1989)
Inculpation et transfert de Christian Dornier., Le Monde (July 16, 1989)
Quatre ans et demi après le drame Non-lieu pour le tueur " dément " de Luxiol, Le Monde (March 5, 1994)
Un forcené tue 14 fois, Le Soir (July 13, 1989)
Il a un regard qui ne regarde pas, Le Nouvel Observateur (July 20, 1989) page 2

French mass murderers
Living people
French murderers of children
1958 births
People with schizophrenia
People from Doubs
People acquitted by reason of insanity
French spree killers
1989 mass shootings in Europe
Familicides